The 2007 League of Ireland First Division season was the 23rd season of the League of Ireland First Division. The First Division was contested by 10 teams and Cobh Ramblers won the division. Finn Harps were also promoted to the Premier Division after a play-off and Wexford Youths made their League of Ireland debut.

Club information

Overview
The regular season began on 8 March and concluded on 10 November. Each team played the other teams four times, totalling 36 games.

Final table

Play-offs

Promotion/Relegation
Finn Harps and Dundalk who finished second and third in the First Division played off against Waterford United who finished eleventh in the Premier Division.
First Round 

Finn Harps qualified for second round. 
Second Round 

Finn Harps win 6–3 on aggregate and are promoted to Premier Division.

Setanta Sports Cup
After winning the First Division, Cobh Ramblers also qualified for the new Setanta Sports Cup play-off. Their opponents were Derry City, the winners of the 2007 League of Ireland Cup.

Derry City qualify for 2008 Setanta Sports Cup.

Top scorers

Gallery

See also
 2007 Shelbourne F.C. season
 2007 League of Ireland Premier Division
 2007 League of Ireland Cup

References

 
League of Ireland First Division seasons
2007 League of Ireland
2007 in Republic of Ireland association football leagues
Ireland
Ireland